Phlegar Building is a historic office building located at Christiansburg, Montgomery County, Virginia.  The original structure was built in the early 19th century, and extensively renovated after 1897.  It is a three-story, rectangular brick building with Italianate style decorative details.  It features a two-story porch of six bays with turned posts, a spindle frieze, brackets, and turned balusters.

It was listed on the National Register of Historic Places in 1989.  It is located in the Christiansburg Downtown Historic District.

References

Commercial buildings on the National Register of Historic Places in Virginia
Italianate architecture in Virginia
Commercial buildings completed in 1897
Buildings and structures in Montgomery County, Virginia
National Register of Historic Places in Montgomery County, Virginia
Individually listed contributing properties to historic districts on the National Register in Virginia